Elley may refer to:

Geography
German exonym for the village Eleja, Latvia

People
Chris Elley (born 1977), founder and current Director of Texas-based film production company Electro-Fish Media LLC
Derek Elley, film critic
Elley Duhé (born 1992), American singer and songwriter
John Elley (1764–1839), Governor of Galway, Colonel of the 17th Lancers, a British cavalry officer who fought with distinction in the Napoleonic Wars
Reed Elley (born 1945), Baptist minister and Canadian politician

See also
Mildred Elley, private two-year college with campuses in Albany, New York and Pittsfield, Massachusetts